Cape J.A.D. Jensen is a headland in the North Atlantic Ocean, east Greenland, Sermersooq municipality. This cape is named after J. A. D. Jensen (1849 - 1936), an officer of the Danish Navy and Arctic explorer.

Geography
Cape J.A.D. Jensen is located on Sokongen Island, between the Nansen Fjord and the J.A.D. Jensen Fjord, 15 km to the WSW of Cape Nansen, north of which the Greenland Sea begins. The island lies in an indented area of the eastern Greenland coast where there is a succession of rocky headlands with active glaciers in between.  

This headland is a massive basalt promontory with steep dark cliffs rising almost 1,000 m over the waters of the Greenland Sea.

References

External links
 Cape Nansen, Greenland

Headlands of Greenland